Turnera opifera is a species of Turnera from 	Minas Gerais, Brazil.

References

External links
 
 

opifera
Flora of Brazil